Karina Sinding Johnson (born May 1, 1991 in West Hills, Los Angeles, California, United States of America) is a Danish-American former competitive figure skater. She is a four-time Danish national champion.

Johnson began skating at age five in Los Angeles, California. She later moved to Houston, Texas and then Miami, Florida. She retired from competition in January 2013.

Her parents are both figure skating coaches. Her father, Kent, is a PSA Double Master Rated Coach, Level 5. Johnson's father is American and her mother is Danish.

Competitive highlights

References

External links

 Official site
 

Danish female single skaters
1991 births
Living people
Figure skaters from Los Angeles
American sportswomen
People from West Hills, Los Angeles
21st-century American women
Danish people of American descent